Charles Smith Sewall (1779 – November 3, 1848) was an American politician from Maryland who served in the Maryland State Senate and House of Delegates as well as the U. S. House of Representatives.

Early life
Charles Smith Sewall was born in Queen Anne's County, Maryland in 1779, to  Clement and Cornelia (née Smith) Sewell. He attended the common schools and St. John's College in Annapolis.

Career
Sewall served in the Forty-second Regiment of the Maryland Militia as a corporal in 1813, during the War of 1812, and served in the Maryland House of Delegates, representing Harford County from 1815 to 1817, 1823 and 1825. He was member of the Maryland State Senate, representing the western shore, from 1826 to 1830. He served as the state commissioner of the Pennsylvania and Maryland Canal Company in 1827.

He was elected as a Jacksonian to the Twenty-second Congress to fill the vacancy caused by the death of George E. Mitchell and served from October 1, 1832, to March 3, 1833. He was again elected as a Democrat to the Twenty-seventh Congress to fill the vacancy which was caused by the death of James W. Williams, and served from January 2 to March 3, 1843. He moved to Harford County, Maryland.

Personal life
Sewall married Anna Catherine. They had six children: Charles S. Jr., Edwin Augustus, Jacob Keazy, Septimus Davidge, James Monroe and Ann Maria.

Sewall died at Rose Hill in Harford County on November 3, 1848.

References

1779 births
1848 deaths
People from Harford County, Maryland
People from Queen Anne's County, Maryland
People from Maryland in the War of 1812
19th-century American politicians
Democratic Party members of the United States House of Representatives from Maryland
Jacksonian members of the United States House of Representatives from Maryland
Democratic Party Maryland state senators
Democratic Party members of the Maryland House of Delegates